Cyril 'Dooley' Lilburne (9 August 1902 – 10 June 1985) was an Australian rules football player who played in the VFL between 1926 and 1929 for the Richmond Football Club.

Notes

References 
 Hogan P: The Tigers Of Old, Richmond FC, Melbourne 1996

External links
 
 

1902 births
1985 deaths
Australian rules footballers from Victoria (Australia)
Australian Rules footballers: place kick exponents
Collegians Football Club players
Brighton Football Club players
Richmond Football Club players